Football Club Groningen is a Dutch professional association football club based in Groningen, province of Groningen. Founded on 16 June 1971 as the successor of GVAV, the team compete in the Eredivisie, the highest tier of Dutch football. Groningen played their inaugural season in the Eredivisie, before the side were relegated to the Eerste Divisie in 1973–74 as they got into financial difficulties. Groningen were promoted back to the Eredivisie as champions in 1979–80 and remained in the top flight for almost 20 seasons before they dropped to the second tier in 1997–98. The team won promotion to the Eredivisie in 1999–2000, where they have remained since.

Groningen have won the KNVB Cup once—in 2014–15—and were runners-up in 1988–89. Groningen achieved their highest-ever league position in 1990–91 when they finished third in the Eredivisie. The side's first participation in European competition came in the 1983–84 UEFA Cup; Groningen defeated Atlético Madrid on aggregate in the first round, but were eliminated by Inter Milan in the following round. Notable players who have played for the club include Ronald Koeman, Arjen Robben, Luis Suárez and Virgil van Dijk.

The team's first home stadium was Oosterparkstadion; since 2006, they have played their home games at Euroborg. Groningen's home kit colours are based on the city's coat of arms: green and white. The club is nicknamed "Trots van het Noorden" (English: "Pride of the North"), and has a rivalry with Frisian side sc Heerenveen, with whom it contests the Derby of the North.

History

Professional football in Groningen

In 1954, professional football started in the Netherlands. In 1956, GVAV became founder members of the first tier Eredivisie, while Be Quick, Velocitas and Oosterparkers were founder members of the Tweede Divisie, the third tier. Oosterparkers quickly returned to amateurism, Velocitas played professional football until 1960 and Be Quick remained professional until 1964; this left GVAV as the city's only professional team.

Although GVAV averaged home attendances of 10,000 or more during the early 1960s, the club had become mired in financial difficulties. This instigated the establishment of "Stichting Betaald Voetbal GVAV" (English: "Professional Football Foundation GVAV") in 1963, a triumvirate of GVAV, the Groningen municipality government and an organization representing local businesses. The three parties paid 300,000 guilders each to be the foundation's shareholders; GVAV's finances remained in a weak position and their future as a professional side was uncertain. The team remained in the Eredivisie throughout the 1960s, however, but were relegated to the Eerste Divisie in 1969–70.

Foundation of FC Groningen 

In February 1970, Harm Brink, the chairman of amateur club , suggested that all Groningen amateur sides should put their best players to the disposal of the local professional team. However, he recognised that the name "GVAV" might be an obstacle in such a cooperation and proposed the foundation of a new club. The amateur clubs supported Brink's idea, and the local businesses and the Groningen municipality government were willing to remit the debt of Stichting Betaald Voetbal GVAV. In September 1970, the GVAV members accepted the plans. The team won promotion to the Eredivisie after a one-year absence, and "Football Club Groningen" were founded on 16 June 1971 as the successor of GVAV, who returned to amateur football. During the 1970–71 season, GVAV goalkeeper and Dutch international Tonny van Leeuwen conceded only seven goals; no goalkeeper conceded fewer during the year and Van Leeuwen was honoured by the Royal Dutch Football Association in Rotterdam. On his way home, he died in a car accident, one day before the club's foundation. Groningen played their first match on 17 July and defeated German Regionalliga side TSR Olympia Wilhelmshaven 6–0. The team played in a green and white kit, the colours of Groningen's coat of arms.

Financial difficulties and relegation from the Eredivisie (1971–1980)
Groningen lost their first league game 1–0 at home against Utrecht in front of an attendance of 13,000 spectators. The team recorded their first league victory on the 10th matchday—a 2–1 win at Vitesse—and finished the 1971–72 Eredivisie season 12th out of 18 sides. The club was still mired in financial difficulties; to cut transfer expenses, Groningen established a scouting system. In 1973, Piet Fransen retired after playing 484 matches for GVAV and Groningen, and gaining 6 caps for the Dutch national team. The following year, Groningen ranked bottom and were relegated to the Eerste Divisie; during the season, the team lost 9–0 to Ajax, Groningen's record defeat. The club came very close to bankruptcy but was saved by the Groningen municipality government. In 1974–75, the side finished finished runners-up to NEC Nijmegen because of a worse goal difference. Groningen qualified for the play-offs which determined the second and final team to gain promotion to the Eredivisie; the side finished second behind FC Eindhoven and remained in the second tier.

In 1975, Groningen established a youth boarding school, and the club tried to rebuild the squad with youth players. The side placed 8th in the 1976–77 Eerste Divisie—Groningen's lowest league finish—before they missed promotion to the Eredivisie on goal difference in the promotion play-offs in 1977–78, despite the 31 goals of Peter Houtman during the season. Groningen finished runners-up to Excelsior in 1978–79, but returned to the Eredivisie as champions in 1979–80 under coach , losing only 4 times in 36 matches. Most of the squad came from Groningen's youth academy.

First European matches (1980–1991)

In 1982–83, Groningen qualified for European competition for the first time following a 5th-place position. Ronald Koeman left the club in 1983 and joined Ajax, while his brother Erwin remained at Groningen; both players had made their professional debut at Groningen. The team debuted in the 1983–84 UEFA Cup first round with an away match against Atlético Madrid—former European Cup finalists—and lost 2–1. Groningen recorded a 3–0 victory in the return game and won 4–2 on aggregate. Inter Milan were the opponents in the second round; Groningen won 2–0 at their Oosterparkstadion but lost 5–1 in Italy and were eliminated from the competition. Groningen competed in European competition again on five occasions from 1986 until 1992, with a place in the third round in the 1986–87 UEFA Cup (eliminated by Vitória de Guimarães) and the 1988–89 UEFA Cup (eliminated by VfB Stuttgart) as the best results.

As a result of the successful spell, Groningen became almost fully professional during the mid-1980s—only Jan van Dijk and Adri van Tiggelen remained semi-professional—and the club recorded the fourth highest average home attendances in Dutch football during this period—behind Ajax, PSV and Feyenoord—as it attracted at least 10,000 fans for each match. In 1989, Groningen reached their first KNVB Cup final but lost 4–1 against PSV. During the same year, Groningen chairman  was found guilty by the Fiscal Information and Investigation Service (FIOD) of embezzlement and using dirty money to lure players into signing for the club. De Vries, Groningen's chairman since 1980, stepped down and later spent several days in prison. Although several other clubs were also investigated and punished by the FIOD during this period, Groningen received an additional assessment of 700,000 guilders from the Tax and Customs Administration. The club was saddled with millions of debt and came close to bankruptcy.

Despite the financial situation, Groningen recorded their highest-ever league finish in 1990–91—third place. Managed by Hans Westerhof, Groningen competed for the league title with Ajax and PSV until the last part of the season, when suspensions and injuries to first team players saw them drop points. Groningen's forward duo, Hennie Meijer and Milko Djurovski, had 27 goals between them; Meijer was named Dutch Footballer of the Year after the season ended.

Decline, recovery and a new stadium (1991–2010)

Although Groningen recorded a 5th-place finish in 1991–92 and qualified for the 1992–93 UEFA Cup, the team began to slide down the league table; they were eventually relegated to the Eerste Divisie in 1997–98. During this period, Groningen had little financial resources left and made many managerial changes in a search for success. The side returned to the Eredivisie in 1999–2000 following a first-place finish in the promotion play-offs group. During the season, Groningen set several club records: they scored 81 goals, won 10 matches in a row and recorded their largest victory—10–1 against DVS '33 in the KNVB Cup. In December 2000, 16-year-old Arjen Robben made his professional debut under coach Jan van Dijk; Robben was soon sold to PSV for a fee of 3.9 million euros. Groningen avoided relegation in their first seasons back in the Eredivisie; under coach Ron Jans, appointed in 2002, Groningen began to return into the top half of the Eredivisie.

In January 2006, Groningen moved from the outdated Oosterparkstadion—the club's first home stadium—to the newly built Euroborg. The club's average home attendance increased from about 12,000 in the Oosterparkstadion to around 20,000 in its new stadium. The team went the first 15 league games unbeaten at Euroborg, and the stadium was soon nicknamed "De Groene Hel" ("The Green Hell"). At the end of the 2005–06 season, Groningen finished in fifth place and qualified for the play-offs which determined a place in the preliminary round of the UEFA Champions League. Groningen reached the final but lost against Ajax on aggregate in the last minutes of the second leg; the team qualified instead for the 2006–07 UEFA Cup in which they were eliminated by Partizan Belgrade in the preliminary round. Groningen again qualified for the UEFA Cup preliminary round the following season but were eliminated by Italian side Fiorentina after a penalty shootout. In 2009, Groningen sold the Swedish striker Marcus Berg—having scored 44 goals in 69 matches—to Hamburger SV for a then-club record fee of 10.5 million euros. The following year, Jans left the club and went to local rivals Heerenveen; his successor was former Groningen player Pieter Huistra.

First major honour (2010–present) 

Under Huistra, the team finished 5th in 2010–11 and reached the European competition play-off final; Groningen turned around a 5–1 deficit against ADO Den Haag but lost after a penalty shootout. In 2013–14, Groningen won the European competition play-off final under coach Erwin van de Looi and qualified for the 2014–15 UEFA Europa League, but lost against Aberdeen in the second qualifying round. Groningen claimed their first major honour during the season, however, defeating PEC Zwolle 2–0 in the 2015 KNVB Cup Final. The side became the third Groningen-based team to win a major honour, after Be Quick won the 1919–20 Dutch League Championship and Velocitas claimed the 1933–34 KNVB Cup. By winning the cup, Groningen qualified for the 2015–16 UEFA Europa League group stage, but gained only two points from six matches and finished the group in bottom place. In 2019, —Groningen's CEO since 1996 and the longest-serving director in Dutch professional football—stepped down and was replaced by Excelsior's Wouter Gudde. In 2020, Arjen Robben came out of retirement and returned to Groningen as a player; Robben made seven appearances for the club before retiring again in 2021.

Crest and colours

Shortly after Groningen were founded in June 1971, Nieuwsblad van het Noorden organised a competition to design a crest for the club. The draft of 21-year-old Reint Rozema, a designer at a local printing house, was chosen: an abstract letter "G", referring to "Groningen". In 1993, board member Jos Smulders proposed the addition of a Pegasus to the badge in order to give the Groningen team "more dynamism and aggression"; in 1996, the Pegasus was removed and the original crest was restored.

Groningen's colours have been green and white since the club's foundation, derived from the city's coat of arms. During their first seasons, the team also played several matches in a purple kit. Groningen's jerseys were manufactured by local companies until 1975, when Adidas became the first to have its logo on the club's shirt. The team's first kit sponsor was AGO in 1982. Since then, the club has had a variety of kit manufacturers and shirt sponsors. Until the early 1990s, Groningen used various permutations of green and white on their home kits, when the club adopted a white shirt with two vertical green stripes.

Stadium

The side have played their home matches at Euroborg since January 2006, which replaced Oosterparkstadion, the home of GVAV and Groningen since the 1930s. The Dutch national team played two international matches at Oosterparkstadion: against Cyprus in 1981 and in 1983 against Iceland. In 1985, Groningen recorded their largest attendance at the stadium in a 1–1 draw against Feyenoord, when 21,500 spectators attended. The club first expressed an interest in building a new stadium away from Oosterparkstadion in 1996 as it had become outdated and had only a capacity of around 12,500. In 2003, Groningen started with the building of  Euroborg; Wiel Arets was the architect. The stadium was opened on 13 January 2006 with a match against Heerenveen, which Groningen won 2–0. It hosted the 2007 UEFA European Under-21 Championship final, in which the Netherlands defeated Serbia 4–1. In 2014, Groningen became the first Dutch club to have its own solar power plant; more than 1,000 solar panels were placed on the roof of Euroborg to make Groningen "more eco-friendly".

Euroborg's current capacity is 22,525, and is nicknamed "De Groene Hel" ("The Green Hell") and "De Groene Kathedraal" ("The Green Cathedral"). The stadium consists of four stands: the Tonny van Leeuwen Tribune, the Piet Fransen Tribune, the Koeman Familie Tribune and a stand containing skyboxes.

Supporters and rivalries

Groningen's supporters are mainly drawn from the provinces of Groningen and Drenthe. During their early years, Groningen also had a decent following in Friesland as they were the only Northern team in the Eredivisie, which earned them the nickname "Trots van het Noorden" ("Pride of the North"). During the late 1970s, an ultras group known as the Z-side emerged from within Groningen's fanbase. The Z-side and other Groningen ultras groups have had long-standing friendships with the ultras and hooligans of A.S. Roma, Beerschot and Rot-Weiß Erfurt. In 1984, a Groningen supporters' association was formed.

As Groningen are one of the few professional sides in the Northern Netherlands and the only team from the province of Groningen, the team lack rivalries. The sides met only four times in the Eredivisie—in 1986–87 and 1988–89, with both teams winning once—as Veendam spent most of their existence in the lower divisions. During the 1990s, Groningen contested heated matches with Twente as hooligans of both clubs often clashed.

During the 1990s, a local rivalry between Groningen and Frisian club Heerenveen developed—known as the Derby of the North (Dutch: Derby van het Noorden)—following Heerenveen's first ever promotion to the Eredivisie in 1989–90. Groningen went down to the Eerste Divisie in 1998, and by 2000, the club was surpassed, in results, by Heerenveen. During the 2000s, the rivalry reached its peak and fans of both clubs pulled pranks, such as Groningen fans painting the statue of Heerenveen's Abe Lenstra in green-white colours. The rivalry faded during the mid-2010s as another Frisian club, Cambuur, won promotion to the Eredivisie; Heerenveen regard Cambuur as their main rivals.

Players

First-team squad

Out on loan

Other players under contract

Management

Football management

Source:

Coaches
Ron Groenewoud was the club's first coach; he was relegated with Groningen to the Eerste Divisie in 1974 and remained in charge until 1975. Groningen won the Eerste Divisie title in 1979–80 under coach Theo Verlangen, who also led the team to qualification for their first ever European campaign in 1983. Hans Westerhof led Groningen to their best ever league finish: third in the 1990–91 Eredivisie. After relegation in 1998, the team won promotion back to the top flight under Jan van Dijk in 1999–2000. Erwin van de Looi led Groningen to their first major honour: the 2014–15 KNVB Cup. The German Frank Wormuth became the club's first foreign coach when he took the post in 2022.

Honours and achievements

Eredivisie (Tier 1)
 Highest position: 3rd in 1990–91
Eerste Divisie (Tier 2)
 Winners: 1979–80
 Promotion play-off winners: 1999–2000
KNVB Cup
 Winners: 2014–15
 Runners-up: 1988–89
Johan Cruyff Shield
 Runners-up: 2015

Records and statistics
The record for the most first team appearances in all competitions for Groningen is held by Jan van Dijk, who played 537 games between 1975 and 1992. The club's top goal scorer is Peter Houtman, who scored 128 goals in three spells for Groningen. He also holds the club record for the most goals scored in a season, when he netted 31 times in 1977–78. The youngest player to play for Groningen is Richairo Živković, who was aged 16 years and 88 days on his debut against Heracles Almelo in 2012. The club's oldest player is goalkeeper Peter van der Vlag, who played his last match aged 37 years and 163 days against NAC Breda in 2015. In 1991, Hennie Meijer won the Dutch Footballer of the Year award, the first and to date only time a Groningen player achieved this.

Groningen's largest ever victory has been a 10–1 win against DVS '33 in the 1999–2000 KNVB Cup. The club's largest win in league football has been a 7–1 home victory against Willem II in the 2010–11 Eredivisie. The largest defeat is an 9–0 loss to Ajax in the 1973–74 Eredivisie.

The highest transfer fee received is €11 million from Celta de Vigo for Norwegian striker Jørgen Strand Larsen in 2022, while the highest transfer fee paid by the club was for Nigerian midfielder Oluwafemi Ajilore from Midtjylland in 2008; he was bought for a fee of €3.3 million.

See also
 FC Groningen in European football

References
Specific

General

External links

FC Groningen on RTV Noord: Club news
FC Groningen news on Boerenmacht.nl
FC Groningen stats on FCG Stats

 
Football clubs in Groningen (city)
Football clubs in the Netherlands
Association football clubs established in 1971
1971 establishments in the Netherlands